2013 Rugby League World Cup Group B is one of the four groups in the 2013 Rugby League World Cup. The group comprises New Zealand, France, Papua New Guinea and Samoa.

Ladder

All times are local – UTC+0/GMT in English venues. UTC+1/CET in French venues. UTC+0/WET in Irish venues. UTC+0/GMT in Welsh venues.

Papua New Guinea vs France

New Zealand vs Samoa

New Zealand vs France

Papua New Guinea vs Samoa

New Zealand vs Papua New Guinea

The 18,180 attendance was higher than all but one of Leeds Rhinos' home Super League attendances for 2013.

France vs Samoa

References

External links

2013 Rugby League World Cup